Porepunkah Airfield  is located in the Buckland Valley  southwest of the township of Porepunkah, Victoria, Australia. It is home to general aviation, ultralight and weight shift aircraft, gliders and occasionally hang gliders.

The airfield was originally a local farmer's paddock, and in 1978, formally commissioned as Buckland Airfield and since then has grown into a picturesque grassed airfield with user hangars, public toilets, public car parking and visiting aircraft parking.

The recent improvements to the airfield include a new vehicular entrance at the north end of the airstrip and the closure of the original road crossing the airfield.

The airfield is managed by a Committee of Management for the Alpine Shire.

The Geelong Gliding Club holds an annual Easter Camp at the Porepunkah aerodrome starting from the Good Friday until the Saturday next week.

See also
 List of airports in Victoria

References

Airports in Victoria (Australia)
Airports established in 1978